Maxi Sandal 2003 / Moonlight is the first Maxi Single (EP/hybrid album) released in 2003 of the Turkish pop singer Mustafa Sandal and the Greek pop singer Natalia.

Track listing
 Maxi Sandal 2003 / Moonlight, 2003
"Aşka Yürek Gerek (Duet Natalia)"  –  – 5:46
"Moonlight (Duet Gülcan)"  –  – 3:59
"Yok Gerekçem (Duet Natalia)"  –  – 3:19
"En Kötü İhtimalle"  –  – 3:43
"Kop (Remix)"  –  – 4:13
"Aşka Yürek Gerek (Orient Mix) (Duet Natalia)"  –  – 4:05
"Aya Benzer (2003 Mix) (Duet Gülcan)"  –  – 3:59
"Aşka Yürek Gerek (Dance Mix) (Duet Natalia)"  –  – 4:40
"Aşka Yürek Gerek (Club Trance Mix) (Duet Natalia)"  –  – 7:20

Credits
 Music direction, arrangements: Yıldıray Gürgen, Alain Konakoğlu, Serkan Dinçer, Bebe Cüneyt, Bülent Aris, Volga Tamöz, Altan Çetin
 Mixing: Alain Konakoğlu
 Publisher: Erol Köse
 Photography: Zeynel Abidin

Music videos
 "Aşka Yürek Gerek"
 "Moonlight"
 "Aya Benzer (2003 Mix) (Duet Gülcan)"

Trivia 
The song "Aşka Yürek Gerek" was a Turkish translation of the Greek folk song "Anaveis Foties"
The Turkish translation was first sung by female Turkish pop singer Dilek Budak

Notes 

Mustafa Sandal albums
Natalia (Greek singer) albums
2003 albums